Salam Pakistan is a romantic comedy directed by Hassan Zee, starring Naghma, Ali Raza, Meerab Khan, and Shabbir Mirza.

Plot 
A second generation Pakistani-American arrives in his family's ancestral town to discover his place in the world and confronts a beautiful historic culture rife with deeply ingrained gender inequality and the subjugation of women.

Cast 

 Naghma as Nazneen
 Ali Raza as Omar
 Meerab Khan as Diya
 Shabbir Mirza as Dada

External links 
 
 Salam Pakistan Facebook page
 Hassan Zee IMDb page

Pakistani romantic comedy films
2018 romantic comedy films
2010s Urdu-language films